This page relates the history of the position of Oklahoma Secretary of Commerce and Tourism.

History
The Oklahoma Secretary of Commerce and Tourism was a member of the Oklahoma Governor's Cabinet. The Secretary was appointed by the Governor, with the consent of the Oklahoma Senate, to serve at the pleasure of the Governor. The Secretary served as the chief advisor to the Governor on economic development and cultural heritage.

The second and last Secretary was Dave Lopez, who was appointed by Governor Mary Fallin on January 27, 2011.

The position of Secretary of Commerce and Tourism was established in 2003 when Governor Brad Henry issued an executive order merging the former positions of Secretary of Commerce and Secretary of Tourism and Recreation into a single position. Previously, both positions had existed since 1986 when they were established by the Executive Branch Reform Act of 1986.

On July 16, 2013, Governor Mary Fallin announced the re-creation of the Secretary of Tourism position and restored the original title of Oklahoma Secretary of Commerce as a result.

Dual position
Oklahoma state law always for Cabinet Secretaries to serve concurrently as the head of a State agency in addition to their duties as a Cabinet Secretary. Historically, the Secretary of Commerce and Tourism often served as the Director of the Oklahoma Department of Commerce. In 2012–2013, Secretary Dave Lopez became the first to not serve in that dual position when he resigned as Executive Director and Jonna Kirschner was appointed to replace him in that capacity alone.

Responsibilities
The Secretary of Commerce and Tourism is responsible for promoting economic development and growth, protecting the State's heritage and history, providing unemployment benefits, promoting housing development, and overseeing workforce development programs.

As of fiscal year 2011, the Secretary of Commerce and Tourism oversees 1883 full-time employees and is responsible for an annual budget of $758 million.

Agencies Overseen
The Secretary of Commerce and Tourism oversees the following State entities:
Governor's Council for Workforce and Economic Development
Capital Investment Board
Department of Commerce
Department of Labor
Department of Tourism and Recreation
Development Finance Authority
Employment Security Commission
Housing Finance Agency
Historical Society
Scenic Rivers Commission

Salary
The annual salary of the Secretary of Commerce and Tourism is set by law at $70,000. Despite this law, if the Secretary serves as the head of a state agency, the Secretary receives the higher of the two salaries. Since incumbent Cabinet Secretary Dave Lopez also serves as the Commerce Department Director, he received the salary allowed for that position. As of 2010, the annual salary of that position is set at $112,500.

List of Secretaries

Secretary of Commerce (1986–2003)

Secretary of Tourism and Recreation (1986–2003)

Secretary of Commerce and Tourism (2003–present)

References

External links
Secretary of Commerce and Tourism Dave Lopez official biography

Commerce and Tourism
Commerce and Tourism